Monika Zguro (born February 8, 1971) is an Albanian model who won the title of Miss Albania in 1993 and Miss Europe in 1995, where she finished third.

References

1971 births
Living people
Albanian female models
Albanian showgirls
20th-century Albanian models
People from Korçë